"Ella, elle l'a" (French for "Ella, She's Got It") is a single released by French singer France Gall. It was released as a single from her album Babacar, on 24 August 1987, and became a hit across Europe, the Americas (especially in Quebec and the Southern Cone) and Asia (especially in Japan). It was covered live by French singer Alizée at a TV show in 2002 and by Belgian singer Kate Ryan in a dance version in 2008.

Background
Written by Michel Berger, the song is a tribute to Ella Fitzgerald, but also a protest against racism and an anthem to personal empowerment. Musically, "it swings between sheared rhythms of the bass and flashed brass". The song is also available on the CD maxi for "Évidemment", released in March 1988. In addition, a live version from her concert album Le Tour de France was released in November of that year.

Critical reception
"Ella elle l'a" won two Victoires de la Musique in 1987 and in 1988. A 1987 review in Pan-European magazine Music & Media elected "Ella elle l'a" single of the week and stated: "This moody and balanced, slowly roking track, written by Michel Berger, deserves to be her next success outside France".

Chart performance
"Ella elle l'a" enjoyed great success in 1987 and 1988, reaching number-one in Austria and Germany in the latter year; in addition, it reached the top ten in Denmark, Sweden, Spain and Argentina. In France, it was certified as silver disc by the Syndicat National de l'Édition Phonographique, reached number two and charted for a total of 19 weeks, nine of them in the top ten.

Track listings
 7" single
 "Ella, elle l'a" (4:49)
 "Dancing Brave" (3:06)
 12" maxi
 "Ella, elle l'a"
 "Papillon de nuit"
 "Dancing Brave"

Charts and certifications

Weekly charts

Year-end charts

Certifications

Kate Ryan version

Kate Ryan's version of "Ella, elle l'a" is the third single of her album Free. It was released on 6 May 2008 in Belgium and on 9 May 2008 in the rest of Europe as a CD single. It had already topped number one on the Spanish Download Chart, and number seven on the Belgian Singles Chart. It also reached the top ten in Germany. It had entered the Swedish Singles Chart at number twelve, peaking at number two. In the Netherlands, Ella Elle L'a also peaked at number two.

English version

"Ella, elle l'a" was sung live by Ryan during her 2008 UK tour and it was released on 25 May 2009 as first single from the UK version of Free.

Track listing
German CD single
"Ella, elle l'a" (radio version) - 3:06
"Ella, elle l'a" (extended version) - 6:07
"L.I.L.Y." (radio edit) - 3:15
Belgian CD single
"Ella, elle l'a" (radio version) - 3:06
"Ella, elle l'a" (extended version) - 6:07
European 12" single
"Ella, elle l'a" (extended version) - 6:07
"Ella, elle l'a" (Bodybangers remix) - 6:05
"Ella, elle l'a" (club remix) - 4:50

Official versions
Extended version - 6:08
Bodybangers remix - 6:05
Club remix - 4:50
Club remix short - 3:12
Fugitive's Elle La Tout Remix

Charts

Certifications

Other cover versions
In 1988, the song was also covered in Greek as Έλα ξανά (Come back again) by Bessy Argyraki who had represented Greece in the Eurovision Song Contest 1977.
In 2002, the song was covered by Emma Daumas, Eva Chemouni, Aurélie Konaté, Nolwenn Leroy and Anne-Laure Sibon, five contestants of the French Star Academy 2, and in 2003, has been sung once by French singer Alizée. The Star Academy version features on the album Star Academy chante Michel Berger.
It was also covered by the French singer Pauline at the Bastille Day concert on the Champ de Mars in Paris in 2008.

References

1987 singles
2008 singles
France Gall songs
Kate Ryan songs
Number-one singles in Austria
Number-one singles in Germany
Songs written by Michel Berger
Song recordings produced by Michel Berger
Universal Music Group singles
Warner Music Group singles
Ella Fitzgerald
Songs about jazz
Songs about musicians
Cultural depictions of jazz musicians
Black-and-white music videos